Cyclophora leonaria is a moth in the  family Geometridae. It is found in the Democratic Republic of Congo, Nigeria, Sierra Leone and on São Tomé.

References

Moths described in 1861
Cyclophora (moth)
Moths of Africa
Insects of the Democratic Republic of the Congo
Insects of West Africa